Nona Tsotsoria (born 13 April 1973) is a Georgian judge born in Batumi, Georgia and currently the judge of the European Court of Human Rights in respect of Georgia.

References

1973 births
Living people
People from Batumi
Judges from Georgia (country)
Judges of the European Court of Human Rights
Judges from Georgia (country) of international courts and tribunals